This article provides details of international football games played by the Hungary national football team from 1930 to 1949.

Results

1930

1931

1932

1933

1934

1935

1936

1937

1938

1939

1940

1941

1942

1943

1945

1946

1947

1948

1949

References 

Football in Hungary
Hungary national football team results
1920s in Hungarian sport
1930s in Hungarian sport